One Too Many may refer to:

 One Too Many (1950 film)
 One Too Many (1916 film), starring Oliver Hardy
 "One Too Many" (song), by Keith Urban and Pink
 One 2 Many, a Norwegian band
 "1, 2 Many", a song by Luke Combs from his album What You See Is What You Get